Immigration Daily (ID) is a daily newspaper on immigration law that claims more than 21,000 subscribers, and subscription is free.

Conceived in May 2000, Immigration Daily is read by attorneys, paralegals, and other readers interested in the latest developments in the immigration law field. It offers sources of information such as the news items, which feature the latest memos, cables, fact sheets and other documents from government agencies such as United States Citizenship and Immigration Services, U.S. Customs and Border Protection and United States Department of State.

Immigration Daily also offers different points of view in its Article section. The variety of articles it carries range from substantive immigration law to new marketing techniques available for attorneys.

Finally, with its News Headlines section, it maintains its readership up-to-date with the latest and newsworthy developments in immigration in the United States.

External links
Official website
Immigration Changes

Daily newspapers published in New York City
American news websites